The 1931 First District A&M Indians football team represented First District Agricultural and Mechanical College—now known as Arkansas State University—as a member of the Arkansas Intercollegiate Conference (AIC) during the 1931 college football season. Led by first-year head coach Jack Dale, the Indians compiled an overall record of 6–2 with a mark of 1–2 in conference play.

Schedule

References

Arkansas State
Arkansas State Red Wolves football seasons
Arkansas State Indians football